Tomlinson Fort (July 14, 1787 – May 11, 1859) was a doctor, politician, and banker in the state of Georgia during the first half of the nineteenth century. He was a member of the Georgia House of Representatives and United States House of Representatives from Georgia.

Early years and education
Fort was born in Warrenton, Georgia on July 14, 1787. He completed preparatory studies and then embarked on the study of medicine. In 1809, he received one term of medical training at the Philadelphia Medical College, and commenced practice in 1810. It was a medical career which eventually spanned four decades. Shortly after taking up the practice of medicine, during the War of 1812, Fort enlisted in a volunteer company of Georgia Militia, and was elected captain.

Political career
Fort was a member of the Georgia House of Representatives for four terms, from 1818 to 1826. During his tenure in the State Legislature, he was instrumental in the formation of the Medical College of Georgia, and the state lunatic asylum in Milledgeville. He was elected as a Jacksonian candidate to the 20th United States Congress and served one term from March 4, 1827, to March 3, 1829.

Later years
He resumed the practice of medicine in Milledgeville, Georgia. He was president of the Central Bank of Georgia for almost a decade, during which time he helped finance construction of the Western and Atlantic Railroad. Tomlinson Fort died on May 11, 1859, in Milledgeville. He is buried in the City Cemetery.

References

External links

 Tomlinson Fort House historical marker

1787 births
1859 deaths
People from Warrenton, Georgia
American people of Cornish descent
Jacksonian members of the United States House of Representatives from Georgia (U.S. state)
Members of the Georgia House of Representatives
People from Milledgeville, Georgia
American slave owners
Physicians from Georgia (U.S. state)
People from Georgia (U.S. state) in the War of 1812
Burials at Memory Hill Cemetery